The 2016 S.League season is Tampines Rovers's 21st season at the top level of Singapore football and 71st year in existence as a football club. The club also competed in the Singapore League Cup, Singapore Cup, Singapore Community Shield and the AFC Cup.

Squad

Sleague Squad

Coaching staff

Transfers

Pre-season transfers

In

Retained

Out

Trial

Friendlies

Pre-season friendlies

Team statistics

Appearances and goals

Competitions

Overview

S.League

Singapore Cup

Quarter-final

Tampines Rovers won 5–2 on aggregate.

Semi-final

Tampines Rovers won 5-3 on aggregate.

Final

Singapore TNP League Cup

Semi-final

AFC Champions League

Qualifying play-off

AFC Cup

Group stage

Knockout stage 

Bengaluru FC won 1–0 on aggregate.

Notes

References

Singaporean football clubs 2016 season
Tampines Rovers FC seasons